John Chubb (10 December 1816 – 30 October 1872), was an English locksmith and inventor who patented many improvements to locks, safes and strong rooms.

He succeeded his father Charles Chubb, who had founded the family company of Chubb & Son.

He wrote an important paper on locks and keys, for which he was awarded the Telford Medal in 1850 by the Institution of Civil Engineers.

He had married twice. His three sons John, George and Henry succeeded him in running the business, of whom George became Baron Hayter of Chislehurst in 1928.

References

1816 births
1872 deaths
19th-century British inventors
Locksmiths
English non-fiction writers
English male non-fiction writers
19th-century English male writers
Businesspeople from Portsmouth
Engineers from Portsmouth